Menippe (minor planet designation: 188 Menippe) is a main belt asteroid. The object has a bright surface and rocky composition. It was discovered by C. H. F. Peters on June 18, 1878, in Clinton, New York, and named after Menippe, one of the daughters of Orion in Greek mythology.

Photometric observations during 2010 showed a synodic rotation period of 11.98 ± 0.02 hours and a brightness variation of 0.28 ± 0.02 in magnitude. Because the rotation period is close to twelve hours, observations were needed at two widely separated observatories in order to build a light curve for the complete rotation.

References

External links 
 Lightcurve plot of 188 Menippe, Palmer Divide Observatory, B. D. Warner (2010)
 Asteroid Lightcurve Database (LCDB), query form (info )
 Dictionary of Minor Planet Names, Google books
 Asteroids and comets rotation curves, CdR – Observatoire de Genève, Raoul Behrend
 Discovery Circumstances: Numbered Minor Planets (1)-(5000) – Minor Planet Center
 
 

Background asteroids
Menippe
Menippe
S-type asteroids (Tholen)
S-type asteroids (SMASS)
18780618